Daria Saville (née Gavrilova, born 5 March 1994) is an Australian professional tennis player. She represented Russia until 2015, before she emigrated to Australia. She competed under her maiden name until her marriage to Luke Saville in 2021.

Nicknamed Dasha, Saville has won one singles title and three doubles titles on the WTA Tour, and has additionally won four singles and two doubles titles on the ITF Circuit. On 28 August 2017, she reached her best singles ranking of world No. 20. On 25 September 2017, she peaked at No. 45 in the doubles rankings.

Saville was an accomplished junior player, having won the 2010 Youth Olympic Games and 2010 US Open, also reaching a combined career-high junior ranking of world No. 1 in August 2010.

In her career, Saville has achieved victories against former Grand Slam champions Maria Sharapova, Ana Ivanovic, Angelique Kerber (her first victory over a reigning world No. 1), and Petra Kvitová (three times), with all of these players being ranked in the top 10 at the time.

Career

2010: No. 1 Junior

Saville was chosen to represent Russia at the inaugural Youth Olympic Games held in Singapore. Despite entering the draw unseeded, Saville progressed to the gold medal match, beating Stefanie Tan, top seed Elina Svitolina, Tang Haochen and seventh seed Jana Čepelová. In the final, Saville went a set down against Zheng Saisai of China, but rallied to win the gold medal. Following her win, Saville became the top ranked junior player by the ITF.

In September, she competed in the junior event at the US Open as the top seed. She progressed through the draw with wins over Lauren Davis, Caroline Price, Tang Haochen, Robin Anderson and Sloane Stephens to set up an all-Russian final with Yulia Putintseva, emerging with a two-sets victory. In addition, Saville competed in the doubles event with fellow Russian Irina Khromacheva, progressing to the semifinal, before losing to eventual champions Tímea Babos and Sloane Stephens.

Following her success in junior tennis, Saville was awarded a wildcard into the main draw of the WTA Tour event in her hometown of Moscow. She faced Ukraine's Alona Bondarenko and lost her WTA debut in straight sets. She ended the year as the No. 1 junior player, and at No. 515 in the WTA rankings.

2011
Saville suffered disappointment in her attempts to become the first junior player since Anastasia Pavlyuchenkova to win two Grand Slam titles, with first-round defeats at the Australian Open and Wimbledon events, a quarterfinal defeat to eventual champion Ons Jabeur at the French Open and a second-round defeat to American Victoria Duval in her defence of her US Open title. As the reigning junior champion, Saville was awarded a wildcard into the qualifying draw for the main event, but lost her first match against Kurumi Nara.

Beginning to compete on the ITF Women's Circuit, Saville lost her first final in the $25k event in Moscow to Lyudmyla Kichenok, but later in the year, claimed her first professional title at the $10k event in Antalya, beating fellow Russian Ksenia Lykina in the final. Saville ended the year ranked world No. 383.

2012: WTA Tour debut
In April, Saville won her first professional doubles title, claiming the title at a $25k event in Chiasso, Switzerland, along with partner Irina Khromacheva. The pair continued their partnership at the junior event of the French Open and claimed the title with a win over Montserrat González and Beatriz Haddad Maia.

In June, Saville qualified for the main draw at a WTA Tour event for the first time, at the Rosmalen Grass Court Championships, there beating higher ranked players Anastasia Rodionova and Yuliya Beygelzimer to progress to the first round. Saville then earned her career-best win, thrashing world No. 35, Yanina Wickmayer, in straight sets but lost in the next round to Kirsten Flipkens.

2013: Grand Slam debut at the Australian Open 
Saville began her season by playing in the qualifying draw in Brisbane. She upset Mariana Duque Mariño in the first round, before losing to Vania King. At the Australian Open, Saville earned a place in the qualifying draw based on her ranking for the first time. In the first round, she beat Stephanie Vogt before upsetting 24th seed Eugenie Bouchard. In the final round of qualifying, she beat Zhou Yimiao in three sets, to earn a spot in the main draw of a Grand Slam tournament for the first time in her career. In the first round, she faced Lauren Davis and won in three sets. Saville's maiden major run came to an end in the second round against fellow qualifier Lesia Tsurenko.

In February, she competed at the Qatar Ladies Open, a Premier-5 level event. In the qualifying draw, she defeated Kristina Barrois, before losing to Tadeja Majerič. However, following the withdrawal of Maria Kirilenko, Saville returned to the draw as a lucky loser, and beat Anabel Medina Garrigues in the first round. In the second round, she played her first match against a top-ten player in world No. 2, Serena Williams, and lost in straight sets. Saville underwent a knee reconstruction in October and finished 2013 ranked No. 144.

2014

She resumed to play in July on the ITF Circuit ranked No. 368. At the $50k event in Sacramento, California, her first event of the year, she claimed the doubles title alongside Storm Sanders, her highest level win to date. In August, it was announced that Saville would play at the US Open representing Australia. She made the second round of qualifying rounds, beating Tadeja Majerič but falling to Chan Yung-jan. 

In September, she qualified for the Pan Pacific Open. She reached the second round, where she was beaten by Carla Suárez Navarro. In early October, Saville claimed the second singles title of her career, defeating Sabina Sharipova in straight sets to win the $25k event at Bangkok. She also reached the final of the doubles competition at the event with her partner Irina Khromacheva, but they lost in straight sets.

In December, Saville competed at the internal wildcard playoff for the 2015 Australian Open. She advanced to the final by beating top seed Olivia Rogowska in the semifinal, before beating Arina Rodionova in straight sets to guarantee herself a place in the main draw of the first major of 2015.

2015: First top-10 win and WTA semifinal

Saville commenced the season by competing at the Brisbane International. Coming through qualifying, she lost in the second round to third seed Angelique Kerber.

In February, Saville won the $50k Burnie International in Australia, defeating top seed Irina Falconi in the final. It was her biggest title win to date. The following week, she competed at the $50k Launceston International, and advanced to the semifinals, in straight sets. There, she beat Falconi in three sets. Later that evening, she played the final against Tereza Mrdeža and won the title with a two-set victory, her second $50k title in two weeks.

In the Miami Open, Saville beat second seed Maria Sharapova in the second round, claiming her first victory over a top-ten player. She subsequently defeated Kurumi Nara in her next match before losing to Karolína Plíšková in the fourth round. Saville then played at the $100k in Cagnes-sur-Mer as the third seed. She lost in the quarterfinals to Pauline Parmentier. Her next tournament was the Premier-5 Italian Open where she qualified by defeating higher ranked players Kurumi Nara and Sílvia Soler Espinosa. She then defeated world No. 33, Belinda Bencic, in three sets in the first round, and world No. 7, Ana Ivanovic. After splitting the first two sets, Saville defeated Ivanovic in the tiebreak on her eighth match point. This was her second top-10 win in a matter of months. She would then progress to the semifinals, losing there in straight sets to Maria Sharapova. It was Saville's first semifinal on the WTA Tour.

2016: Hopman Cup champion and first WTA Premier final

She began her season playing at the 2016 Hopman Cup in the Australia Green team, alongside Nick Kyrgios. In the round-robin stage of the tournament, her only singles win was over Sabine Lisicki, however she and Kyrgios were undefeated in the mixed-doubles stage of each tie. In their tie against France, Saville saved a match point in the mixed doubles event when Australia was down 8–9 in the match tiebreak. They went on to win the match in three sets, securing their place in the final. Saville and Kyrgios were the eventual champions of the tournament, defeating the Ukrainian team of Elina Svitolina and Alexandr Dolgopolov in both singles matches. This was only the second time that the Australian team has won the Hopman Cup, the first time being in 1999.

In the Australian Open, she had wins against Lucie Hradecká, Petra Kvitová, and Kristina Mladenovic, but then lost in the fourth round to tenth seed Carla Suárez Navarro. In April, Saville made the quarterfinal of Madrid and the third round of Rome. At the French Open, she lost to Mariana Duque Mariño in round one and made the second round of Wimbledon. At the Olympic Games in Rio de Janeiro, Saville drew world No. 1, Serena Williams, and lost in round one. At the US Open, she lost to Lucie Šafářová, again in round one.

In October, Saville reached the quarterfinal at China Open, semifinal in Hong Kong and a week later, her first Premier final in Moscow, in both doubles and singles.

2017: First WTA Premier title
Starting the year out in the Hopman cup partnering with Nick Kyrgios. They made it to the semifinals before losing to Team USA. Saville played in Sydney but fell in the round of 16 to eventual champion Johnna Konta. For the second year in a row, Saville made it to the fourth round at the Australian Open beating Naomi Broady, Ana Konjuh and Timea Bacsinszky. She lost to Karolína Plíšková in straight sets. In Indian Wells, Saville fell in the third round while in Miami, she fell in the second round to Lucie Šafářová. She began her clay-court season at the Charleston Open with a win over Alison Riske but losing in the round of 16 to the eventual champion and good friend, Daria Kasatkina. Her best result on clay was at the Italian Open where she had to play the qualifying and reached the quarterfinals, before losing to Kiki Bertens.

In August, Saville won her first WTA Tour title at the Connecticut Open, defeating Dominika Cibulková in three sets.

2019

Saville kicked off her 2019 season at the Brisbane International. She lost in the first round to eighth seed Anastasija Sevastova. In Sydney, she was defeated in the first round by qualifier Yulia Putintseva. At the Australian Open, she lost in the first round to Tamara Zidanšek.

At the St. Petersburg Ladies' Trophy, Saville was defeated in the first round by Maria Sharapova. During the Fed Cup tie versus the U.S. team, she played one rubber and lost to Danielle Collins. Despite her loss, Australia ended up winning the tie 3–2. At the Mexican Open, she was defeated in the first round by fourth seed Mihaela Buzărnescu. In March, she competed at the Indian Wells Open where she reached the third round, before losing to sixth seed Elina Svitolina. At the Miami Open, she was defeated in the first round by Viktória Kužmová.

Beginning her clay-court season at the Morocco Open, she lost in the first round to second seed Hsieh Su-wei. At the Madrid Open, she was defeated in the first round by ninth seed Ash Barty. In Rome, she lost in the first round of qualifying to Irina-Camelia Begu. Playing her final tournament before the French Open at the Internationaux de Strasbourg, she advanced to the quarterfinals where she was defeated by Chloé Paquet. At the French Open, she retired from her first-round match against Aleksandra Krunić due to a thigh injury.

In Eastbourne, Saville lost in the final round of qualifying to Fiona Ferro. Despite the loss, she entered the main draw as a lucky loser where she reached the second round and was defeated by Zhang Shuai. At the Wimbledon Championships, she lost in the first round to eighth seed and eventual semifinalist, Elina Svitolina.

Seeded seventh at the Ladies Open Lausanne, Saville was defeated in the second round by Natalia Vikhlyantseva. At the Palermo Ladies Open, Saville lost in the first round to eighth seed and eventual champion, Jil Teichmann. Seeded fifth at the first edition of the Karlsruhe Open, Saville was defeated in the first round by Tereza Martincová.

At the US Open, Saville lost in the first round to Fiona Ferro.
She didn't play any more tournaments for the rest of the season due to injuries. She ended the season ranked No. 237.

2020–2021
Saville missed the Australian Open due to recovering from an achilles tendon injury and plantar fasciitis.

She returned to action in September at the Open de Cagnes-sur-Mer. Getting past qualifying, she made it to the quarterfinals where she lost to Viktoriya Tomova. At the French Open, she got her first victory since July 2019 by upsetting 24th seed Dayana Yastremska in the first round. She was defeated in the second round by Eugenie Bouchard.

Saville ended the year ranked 446.

She started 2021 season at the first edition of the Yarra Valley Classic where she lost in the second round to fifth seed Serena Williams. At the Australian Open, she was defeated in the second round by top seed and compatriot Ashleigh Barty.

After the championship, Saville announced that she was going to get surgery on her achilles tendon.

In November, Saville represented Australia at the Billie Jean King Cup Finals defeating world No. 70, Greet Minnen, in her first professional match since February. Australia lost in the semifinals against Switzerland.

Saville ended the season ranked 419.

2022: Lowest ranked quarterfinalist in Miami Open history, return to top 50, second ACL injury
Saville began her season at the Adelaide International 1, defeating Caty McNally and Katie Boulter in qualifying, before losing to Iga Świątek in the first round. She received a wildcard into the Adelaide International 2, but again lost in the first round to Ana Konjuh. Receiving another wildcard into the main draw of the Australian Open, she lost in the first round to Rebecca Peterson. Using a protected ranking, Saville entered the Abierto Zapopan ranked No. 627 in the world. She defeated reigning US Open champion and top seed, Emma Raducanu, in the first round and Caroline Dolehide in the second, before losing to eventual champion Sloane Stephens in the quarterfinals. This run saw her ranking rise to No. 410.

In March, Saville made it through qualifying at Indian Wells, defeating Kamilla Rakhimova and Magdalena Fręch. She bested Zhang Shuai in the first round before defeating ninth seed Ons Jabeur in the second; this was Saville's first top-10 win since 2018. She then defeated 20th seed Elise Mertens, before retiring in the fourth round against eventual finalist and sixth seed Maria Sakkari. The following week, she received a main draw wildcard to compete at the Miami Open. She reached the quarterfinals, defeating Greet Minnen, lucky loser Harmony Tan, Kateřina Siniaková, and lucky loser Lucia Bronzetti. She became the lowest ranked Miami quarterfinalist in history, ranked No. 249 in the world at the time. She lost to 22nd seed Belinda Bencic in the quarterfinals.

At the German Open, she reached the second round as a qualifier. As a result, she returned to the top 100 in the singles rankings.

At the Washington Open, Saville reached the semifinals, beating the top seed and world No. 7, Jessica Pegula, en route. Next, she lost to sixth seed Kaia Kanepi. As a result, she reached her highest ranking since her return from injury.. At the Pan Pacific Open in Tokyo, Saville tore her ACL while playing against home favourite Naomi Osaka in her opening-round match. She has since undergone surgery and is expected to return in July/August 2023.

Personal life
Daria's relationship with Australian tennis player Luke Saville influenced her decision to become an Australian citizen.
She and Luke became engaged on 6 December 2018. They married on 4 December 2021.

Performance timelines

Only main-draw results in WTA Tour, Grand Slam tournaments, Fed Cup/Billie Jean King Cup and Olympic Games are included in win–loss records.

Singles
Current after the 2022 Toray Pan Pacific Open.

Doubles

WTA career finals

Singles: 5 (1 title, 4 runner-ups)

Doubles: 5 (3 titles, 2 runner-ups)

ITF Circuit finals

Singles: 6 (4 titles, 2 runner-ups)

Doubles: 3 (2 titles, 1 runner-up)

Team finals

Junior Grand Slam finals

Girls' singles: 2 (1 title, 1 runner-up)

Girls' doubles: 1 (title)

Summer Youth Olympic Games

Singles: 1 (gold medal)

Head-to-head record

Record against top 10 players
Saville's record against players who have been ranked in the top 10 of the WTA rankings. Active players are in boldface.

No. 1 wins

Top 10 wins

Notes

References

External links

 
 
 
 
 

1994 births
Living people
Russian female tennis players
Australian female tennis players
Naturalised citizens of Australia
Naturalised tennis players
Russian emigrants to Australia
Tennis players from Moscow
Tennis players at the 2010 Summer Youth Olympics
Australian people of Russian descent
French Open junior champions
Hopman Cup competitors
US Open (tennis) junior champions
Grand Slam (tennis) champions in girls' singles
Sportswomen from Victoria (Australia)
Tennis players from Melbourne
Olympic tennis players of Australia
Tennis players at the 2016 Summer Olympics
Youth Olympic gold medalists for Russia
Grand Slam (tennis) champions in girls' doubles